Sara Jane Hurley (née Skinner; born 1966) is the Chief Dental Officer (England).

Hurley qualified from the University of Bristol Dental School in 1988 with a BDS. She was commissioned into the Royal Army Dental Corps, and gained an MSc in Dental Public Health in 2004 from University College London. She went on to work at the Royal Centre for Defence Medicine, Birmingham, and was appointed Chief Dental Officer for the Army.

She was appointed by NHS England as Chief Dental Officer in August 2015.

In 2020, Hurley issued instructions to suspend and resume primary care dentistry in England during the COVID-19 pandemic.

As the Chief Dental Officer for England, Hurley has provided updates to dental teams regarding NHS contractual changes, which include the implementation of a minimum indicative UDA value of £23, updates to support enhanced UDAs for higher needs patients, and personalization of recall intervals. She has urged staff to receive influenza vaccinations to protect both themselves and their patients. Moreover, Hurley has emphasized the importance of implementing skill mix in the dental profession, to encourage the use of dental therapists and other dental care professionals.

References

 

Alumni of the UCL Medical School
Alumni of the University of Bristol
Chief Dental Officers for England
English dentists
1966 births
Living people